This is a list of the National Register of Historic Places listings in Mobile, Alabama.

This is intended to be a complete list of the properties and districts on the National Register of Historic Places in Mobile, Alabama, United States. Latitude and longitude coordinates are provided for many National Register properties and districts; these locations may be seen together in an online map.

There are 138 properties and districts listed on the National Register in Mobile County, including 4 National Historic Landmarks. 114 of these sites, including all of the National Historic Landmarks, are located within the city limits of Mobile, and are listed here; the remaining 24 sites are listed separately.

History

Located at the junction of the Mobile River and Mobile Bay on the northern Gulf of Mexico, Mobile began as the first capital of colonial French Louisiana in 1702 and remained a part of New France for over 60 years.  The city was ceded to Great Britain in 1763, and under British rule the colony continued as part of West Florida. Spain captured Mobile during the American Revolutionary War in 1780, with the Battle of Fort Charlotte.

The city first became a part of the United States in 1813, following the U.S. seizure of Spanish West Florida during the War of 1812. The city and surrounding territory was first added to the Mississippi Territory. It was included in the Alabama Territory in 1817, after Mississippi gained statehood. A fire in October 1827 destroyed most of the old colonial buildings in the city, but from the 1830s onward Mobile expanded with a primary focus on the cotton trade. The city experienced another major fire in 1839 that burned a large central portion of the city and destroyed many of its finest new buildings.  On May 25, 1865, an ammunition depot explosion, termed the great Mobile magazine explosion, killed some 300 people and destroyed the northern portion of the city.

Mobile's population had increased from around 40,000 people in 1900 to 60,000 by 1920.  Between 1940 and 1943, over 89,000 people moved into Mobile to work for war effort industries.  By 1956 the city limits had tripled to accommodate growth. The city lost many of its historic buildings during urban renewal in the 1960s and 1970s. This led to the establishment of the Mobile Historic Development Commission, charged with protecting and enhancing the city's historic resources. Beginning in the late 1980s, the city began an effort termed the "String of Pearls Initiative" to make Mobile into a competitive, urban city. This effort would see numerous projects around the city, including the restoration of hundreds of historic buildings and homes.

Architecture
Mobile has antebellum architectural examples of the Federal, Greek Revival, Gothic Revival, and Italianate styles. Additionally, the Creole cottage and Gulf Coast cottage are building types that are indigenous to the area, and are among the earliest surviving house types. Mobile's downtown townhouses, primarily built between the 1840s and 1860s, typically combine Late Federal style architecture with Greek Revival or Italianate elements and cast iron galleries.

Current listings

|}

See also

 List of National Historic Landmarks in Alabama
 National Register of Historic Places listings in Alabama

References

 
Mobile
Mobile, Alabama